KAVB may refer to:

 KAVB (FM), a radio station (98.7 FM) licensed to serve Hawthorne, Nevada, United States
 Koninklijke Algemeene Vereniging voor Bloembollencultuur